Distancia (In English: Distance) is the fifth studio album by the Mexican jazz singer Magos Herrera, released on May 5, 2009. Tim Ries produced the album along with Herrera.

Background and theme

Recorded in New York City, Distancia includes songs written by Herrera and by composers like Antonio Carlos Jobim and César Portillo de la Luz.

The record includes original themes "Reencuentro"; "Tus ojos"; "Staying Closer" and "Alegría", with scintillating vocal percussion interlacing with rhythmic Pan-Afro/American structures, with touches of sonorities that evoke Joni Mitchell, and pat-flavored flamenco, as well as reinterpretations of classic themes from Antonio Carlos Jobim, Milton Nascimento and César Portillo de la Luz "Retrato em Branco e preto", "Inutil Paisaje", "Dindi", "Veracruz" and "Tu, Mi Delirio".

Track listing
 "Reencuentro" (Reunion)
 "Tus Ojos" (Your Eyes)
 "New Song"
 "Retrato Em Branco E Preto" (Portrait in Black And White)
 "Inutil Paisaje" (Useless Landscape)
 "Veracruz"
 "Staying Closer"
 "Tu, Mi Delirio" (You, My Delirium)
 "Alegría" (Joy)
 "Dindi"

Personnel
 Magos Herrera, vocals
 Lionel Loueke, guitar
 Aaron Goldberg, piano
 Ricky Rodriguez, bass
 Alex Kauta, drums
 Jennifer Beaujean, Ingrid Beaujean, vocals

References

Magos Herrera albums
2009 albums
Sunnyside Records albums